Lieutenant General Rocky Ricardo Meade  is a Jamaican military leader who was the third Chief of Defence Staff (CDS) of the Jamaica Defence Force (JDF), serving from December 2016 to January 2022.

Military service
Meade joined the Jamaica Defence Force (JDF) in 1984. Meade was integral in the conceptualization and implementation of the Jamaica National Service Corps  Meade has served as Chair of CARICOM Military Chiefs, the Governance Committees of the University of Technology and HEART Trust National Training Agency; Chair of the Private Sector Organization of Jamaica's Crime Strategy Committee, Vice President of the Royal Air Forces Association Jamaica 580 Branch, Vice President of the Jamaica Legion, Chair of the Jamaica Combined Cadet Force Committee,  President Emeritus of the International Society for Pidgin and Creole Linguistics, Chair of the Editorial Board of the Society for Caribbean Linguistics and Committee Chair of the Linguistic Society of America.

Public service
On September 13, 2022, Meade was appointed Cabinet Secretary and Head of the Public Service. Meade will succeed Ambassador Douglas Saunders, who will step down on October 1, 2022. On September 14, 2022, Meade declined Cabinet Secretary appointment amid controversy.

Education
He is a graduate of Wolmer's School, where he was a Deputy Head Boy and Warrant Officer Class 2 in the Jamaica Combined Cadet Force. Meade gained his Private Pilot Licence as a Cadet. He attended the Royal Military Academy, Sandhurst where he was adjudged the top International Student and awarded the Overseas Cane. Meade holds a Bachelor of Arts and a Master of Arts in Linguistics both from the University of the West Indies, a Master of Military Arts and Science from the US Army Command and General Staff College. He also holds a PhD in Linguistics from the University of Amsterdam and is an alumnus of the George C. Marshall European Center for Security Studies in Germany. In April 2019, Meade, alongside General Bari del Valle Sosa from Argentina and General Bipin Rawat from India, was inducted into the Command and General Staff College International Hall of Fame.

Awards
He is a Commander of the Order of Distinction and the Justice of the Peace and a recipient of Queen Elizabeth II Diamond Jubilee Medal and the Medal of Honour for Meritorious Service.

References

Living people
Year of birth missing (living people)
Place of birth missing (living people)
Jamaican military officers
Chiefs of Defence Staff (Jamaica)
Graduates of the Royal Military Academy Sandhurst
Jamaican justices of the peace
Commanders of the Order of Distinction